Helmville is an unincorporated community in Powell County, Montana, United States. The community has a post office with ZIP code 59843.

The community is named for J. H. Helms, who applied for a post office. It was granted in 1872.

Helmville is near the confluence of Nevada Creek and the Blackfoot River.

Demographics

References

Unincorporated communities in Powell County, Montana
Unincorporated communities in Montana